Serhiy Kopanayko (born 5 November 1988) is a Ukrainian athlete specialising in the sprint hurdles. He represented his country at the 2016 World Indoor Championships, but did not advance past the first round.

His personal bests are 13.77 seconds in the 110 metres hurdles (0.0 m/s, Yalta 2012) and 7.70 seconds in the 60 metres hurdles (Kiev 2016).

Competition record

References

1988 births
Living people
Ukrainian male hurdlers
Place of birth missing (living people)
Competitors at the 2011 Summer Universiade